= Academy Award for Best Writing =

The Academy Award for Best Writing is divided into two subcategories:

- Academy Award for Best Writing (Adapted Screenplay)
- Academy Award for Best Writing (Original Screenplay)
